The Australian National University Union Incorporated (ANU Union), established in 1965, is an inactive not-for-profit association that previously operated commercial premises at The Australian National University. It is not to be confused with the Australian National University Student Association, which despite its name, is recognised as the University's Students' Union.

History 

The Union was set up in 1965 to provide a meeting place for students, graduates and staff.  The original charter indicated that the Union would be an incorporated body based on “sound business principles”.

The Union evolved from the Student’s Association.  It concentrated on small scale activities such as debates, films, music, food and even art exhibitions.  In 1965 the Union was established in what is now the Pauline Griffin Building and in 1973 it moved to the former Union Building in Union Court.

Due to the redevelopment of Union Court, the Union vacated its premises in 2017. In March 2019, the Union reopened in a new location at 3 Rimmer St ACTON.

Membership 
All students of the University are automatically ANU Union members. Membership is also open to ANU staff and graduates.

Purpose 
The objects of the Union are:
 to provide a recognised meeting place and social centre for its members;
 to promote the intellectual, social and general welfare of the University community, and
 actively to encourage and support all ANU clubs and societies which include members of the Union.

Union Business Operations
The ANU Union now sports a bar, several food outlets, two beer gardens and a refectory. It provides discount food and drink to students as well as an affordable function space.

Board of directors
The Union Board is the governing body of the ANU Union.  It is responsible for keeping the management of the ANU Union accountable, ensuring fiscal stability and guiding the Union’s strategic direction.  The Board conducts these functions through regular Board meetings and through liaison with the Business Manager.  The Board is made up of nine Directors: six undergraduates, one post graduate, and two university representatives.

Undergraduate board members are elected for two years, the post graduate board member is elected for a one year term, and the university board members are appointed indefinitely by the university.

Former Members of the Board
Prominent former members of the ANU Union's Board of Directors include:

Andrew Barr Member of the Australian Capital Territory Legislative Assembly, Chief Minister of the Australian Capital Territory.
Chris Steel Member of the Australian Capital Territory Legislative Assembly, Cabinet Minister.
Terence John Higgins, Chief Justice of the Supreme Court of the Australian Capital Territory.

References

External links
 ANU Union Home Page

Australian National University
Non-profit organisations based in the Australian Capital Territory
Student organisations in Australia